The Valea Nouă is a right tributary of the river Crișul Negru in Romania. It discharges into the Crișul Negru near Tinca. The lower reach of the river is channelized.

Tributaries

The following rivers are tributaries to the Valea Nouă:
Left: Rebi, Hatasău, Mădărăsău, Pârâu, Fonău
Right: Palincăria, Maca, Boboșița

References

Rivers of Romania
Rivers of Bihor County